{{DISPLAYTITLE:C14H18N2O5}}
The molecular formula C14H18N2O5 (molar mass: 294.303 g/mol, exact mass: 294.1216 u) may refer to:

 Aspartame
 Kelatorphan

Molecular formulas